Malak Hamza (born 5 November 2001) is an Egyptian trampoline gymnast. She competed in the 2020 Summer Olympics.

References

2001 births
Living people
Egyptian female trampolinists
Gymnasts at the 2020 Summer Olympics
Olympic gymnasts of Egypt
Sportspeople from Giza